The Pussycat Dolls Tour (also informally known as The Unfinished Business Tour) was the planned third concert tour by American girl group the Pussycat Dolls. It was announced in 2019, when Nicole Scherzinger, Ashley Roberts, Carmit Bachar, Kimberly Wyatt and Jessica Sutta revealed that they were reforming for new music and a brand new concert tour. Former member Melody Thornton declined to reunite but decided to continue with her career as a solo recording artist. The announcement followed the release of "React", the first new song by the group in more than decade.

The tour was due to begin in April 2020 with 10 arena dates around the UK and Ireland, but these were postponed until the Autumn and then Spring-Summer 2021 due to the worldwide COVID-19 pandemic. It was then scheduled to begin on May 21, 2021, with ten dates across the UK and Ireland. A number of festival dates were cancelled all together including a headline slot at Brighton Pride (UK), So Pop Festival (Australia and New Zealand), Untold Festival (Romania), and Superbloom Festival (Germany), while some international dates in Japan, Brazil, and the Philippines were postponed pending further confirmation. Following further delays which were down to the pandemic, breach of contracts and logistics, the tour was ultimately cancelled in January 2022 with the fate of the Pussycat Dolls unknown pending the legal dispute between Scherzinger and Antin regarding the terms of the group's business ventures.

Background

The Pussycat Dolls reunited in November 2019 for a performance on the finale of UK reality tv competition The X Factor: Celebrity, where alongside previous singles, they also performed a new song "React". Following the performance, it was confirmed that new music was in production alongside a UK and Ireland concert tour. The tour would be the group's first since 2009's Doll Domination Tour, and "React" was the first release by the group in more than a decade. Former member, Melody Thornton decided not to reunite with the them in order to focus on her solo career.

Speaking on their decision to tour the UK, Roberts told the BBC, "L.A. was our home, but the U.K. was our second home because the British just scooped us up. So, our lives ended up here as well, some of us, so the fans have just been holding on strong with wanting this reunion and our biggest fanbase is over here." In the same interview, Wyatt noted that the Pussycat Dolls had been talking about a reunion for some years, "it’s been a few years in the making, and the tour was dubbed Unfinished Business, supported by comments made by both Roberts and Wyatt. Wyatt said "I think ultimately there’s some unfinished business with The Pussycat Dolls" and Roberts agreed, noting that it had "been 10 years ... we just all were ready to do it". The tour was also known as the Unfinished Business Tour. As part of the tour, the group was confirmed to be headlining the second day of Fabuloso Pride in the Park, Brighton's Pride celebrations on August 2, 2020.

Changes to scheduling 
The Pussycat Doll Tour's first leg was supposed to begin in April 2020, visiting nine venues around the UK and Ireland, plus an appearance at Fabuloso Pride in the Park (Brighton) in August. However, by March 2020 the UK was being impacted by the COVID-19 pandemic, leading to social restrictions making the tour impossible to go ahead; new dates were planned for October. Following the same guidance regarding social restrictions, organisers of Pride in the Park announced the event was being delayed 2021, with the Pussycat Dolls returning to headline. 

The tour was then scheduled to begin in July 2020 with a number of festival and racecourse events through the UK and Ireland, as well as the Untold Festival in Romania, and Superbloom Festival in Germany. The arena dates for the UK and Ireland would then follow in October, beginning with Newcastle on October 19 and ending in Dublin, Ireland on November 2. However, on July 2, 2020, the tour was confirmed to have been pushed back into 2021, with dates now spanning May and June. Other previously announced 2020 international appearances including in the Philippines, Japan, and Brazil were either postponed or cancelled all together. A third announcement came in March 2021, several months ahead of the new scheduled dates. Ticketmaster informed customers that the tour was being rescheduled once again at the request of the organisers. No new dates were announced but there was the promise of further announcements to follow in due course.

Legal dispute and cancellation 

In September 2021, it was reported that Scherzinger was refusing to take part in the tour and had been subsequently sued by Robin Antin, founder of the Pussycat Dolls. The media reported that Scherzinger had originally agreed to 49% of the tour's earnings but was now refusing to take part unless this rose to 75% and included overall creative control. Documents filed at the Los Angeles Superior Court found that the basis of the agreement was a Memorandum of Understanding that Scherzinger had committed to 45 shows, under terms that she would receive 32.5% of earnings from the tour, with Sutta, Roberts, Wyatt and Antin also receiving 12.5% and Bachar receiving 5%, reflecting that she left before the release of the group's second album, Doll Domination (2008). The legal dispute came from Scherzinger wanting to negotiate the terms of PCD Worldwide, a new business venture that would handle future earning from the group and brand from existing terms of 49% to an increased 75%, to reflect "opportunities she would have to forego to continue to engage in "the partnership with Antin".

Scherzinger's lawyer released a counter-statement to Antin's claims. Amongst the response was details of $600,000 advance from Live Nation that Antin had received to support the tour and now "won't or can't repay", as well as accusing her of "trading on Nicole's name without her consent" and public release of the group's financial arrangements for the tour. Scherzinger concluded that the lawsuit was "ludicrous and false", and that under those circumstances, the tour cannot happen. In January 2022, Scherzinger officially confirmed the tour's cancellation on an Instagram stories post. The official reasons cited "evolving circumstances surrounding the pandemic". Not long after, group members Sutta and Bachar confirmed that they had only learnt about the tour's cancellation from Scherzinger's Instagram post, writing their own statement, saying: "We want to say how incredibly disappointed we are to learn of an announcement made on Instagram that The Pussycat Dolls reunion tour is canceled. As of now, there has been no official notification of that." Antin also confirmed the tour's cancellation stating that "all of us have made personal & financial sacrifices" and later confirming that there were "truths to this situation" which may see the light of day one day. Despite referring to the tour cancellation as "the end of a chatper", Sutta and Bachar remained optimistic about the future of the group, stating that "[it] is not the end of the Dolls story, [we have] created a sisterhood that will live on"." Wyatt has expressed she has "done all [she] can", as she was the motivator for the reunion for years. She confirmed that both she and Roberts still want the tour to happen.

Reception
When the tour was announced for April 2020, the group were only intending to play one date at The O2 Arena. However, due to strong demand an additional date was added for April 19, 2020.

Tour dates

Arena shows

Festival and international shows

Notes

References

Concert tours of Ireland
Concert tours of the United Kingdom
Reunion concert tours
The Pussycat Dolls concert tours
Concert tours postponed due to the COVID-19 pandemic
Concert tours cancelled due to the COVID-19 pandemic